Kim Kristensen (born 10 January 1975) is a Danish professional football coach and former player who is currently the head coach of Denmark Series club Holstebro Boldklub.

References

External links
 Boldklubben Frem profile

Living people
1975 births
Danish men's footballers
Boldklubben Frem players
FC Midtjylland players
Vejle Boldklub players
Herfølge Boldklub players
Association football midfielders
Ringkøbing IF managers
Danish football managers